The International Identity Federation was formed in Scotland during 2006.  IDFed provides a web-based solution to the problem of identification of injured or distressed travellers.  Members are issued with a unique number embossed onto an identity tag or bracelet.  They use a forum to log their movements and this relates back to a secure data base controlled by a 24-hour monitoring service. In the event of a member being found helpless, the 18-digit unique number (created using an algorithm) is used to inform next of kin or employers and aid in the treatment and/or repatriation of the member. For those undertaking particularly hazardous or dangerous journeys, DNA profiling is also offered through a UK Department of Justice approved specialist DNA laboratory based at the Southern General Hospital in Glasgow.

Sources
 The Press and Journal  (http://www.pressandjournal.co.uk). Wednesday April 2, 2008.  "Identity Tags Provide Reassurance."
 Daily Record (http://www.dailyrecord.co.uk). Wednesday April 2, 2008. "Tagging Along."
Courier and Advertiser (http://www.thecourier.co.uk). Wednesday April 2, 2008.  "New Service for Travellers."
Scottish Television (stv.tv) Evening News, April 1, 2008.

References 

Safety
International travel documents
2006 establishments in Scotland